The 2002 Women's British Open Squash Championships was held at the Lambs Squash Club, London (qualifying) and the National Squash Centre in Manchester from 8–15 April 2002. The event was won by Sarah Fitzgerald who defeated Tania Bailey in the final.

Seeds

Draw and results

Qualifying round

First round

 Suzanne Horner (née Burgess) withdrew.

Second round

Quarter-finals

Semi-finals

Final

References

Women's British Open Squash Championships
Squash competitions in London
Sports competitions in Manchester
Women's British Open Squash Championship
Women's British Open Squash Championship
2000s in Manchester
Women's British Open Squash Championship
2002 in women's squash